Oury Amos Cherki (. born in 1959, alternative spelling Uri Sherki) is chairman of Brit Olam – Noahide World Center, a senior lecturer at Machon Meir, leader of congregation "Bayt Yehuda" in the Kiryat Moshe neighborhood of Jerusalem, and has published numerous works on Jewish thought and philosophy.

Biography

Rav Cherki was born in Algeria in 1959. His grandfather, Eyzer Cherki, was a Torah scholar and community leader in Algeria, and later in France. Eyzer served as the president of the Zionist Federation of Algeria, a representative at the Zionist Congress, and was involved in the founding Jewish education in Algeria. Rav Cherki's father was a businessman, held a doctorate in economics, and supported his grandfather in his public activities.

Rav Cherki moved to France as a child for a number of years. He moved to Israel in 1972, where he studied at the "Netiv Meir" Yeshiva High School, and later at Merkaz Harav Yeshiva under Rav Zvi Yehuda Kook. He had also studied under Rav Yehuda Leon Ashkenazi, Rav Meir Yehuda Getz, and Rav Shlomo Binyamin Ashlag. He performed his military service in the artillery branch of the IDF.

Rav Cherki is involved with the organization Rosh Yehudi, and gives lectures around Israel, including specialized courses for Jewish educators on teaching Judaism to the general public. He taught a weekly class at the Technion, Haifa, for a number of years, and taught at the Hesder Yeshiva Binot in Ra'anana. Rav Cherki is one of the founders of the organization Brit Olam, - Noahide World Center which aims to raise awareness of the Seven Laws of Noah and to promote their recognition and fulfilment in the world. At the heart of the organization's activities is to give spiritual and practical guidance to the communities of Noahides. 

Rav Cherki publicly supported the "Jewish Leadership" faction of the Likud Party and the Bayit Yehudi.

Family
He is married to Ronit and they have seven children and reside in Jerusalem. His son, Yair Cherki, is a well-known journalist in Israel whilst another one of his sons, Shalom Yochai Cherki, was murdered in a devastating terrorist attack in April 2015.

Views

Rav Cherki's thought is heavily influenced by Rav Abraham Isaac Kook and Rav Yehuda Leon Ashkenazi (Manitou), while incorporating his original interpretations. He has disseminated his teachings primarily in lectures on a wide range of topics that draw on his broad knowledge base (Torah, philosophy, science, history, etc.).

Rav Cherki places a particular emphasis on the meaning of Zionism and the establishment of the state of Israel. He asserts that the birth of modern political Zionism signified the "beginning of the redemption" (atchalta d'geulah), whose climax was the Balfour Declaration, and the founding of the State of Israel signified the final act in the process of redemption. Thus, from the perspective of Jewish law, the Jews are, today, already in the "period of the Messiah".

This being the case, he also maintains that the ultimate purpose of the Jewish people is a universal one, and that is to bring blessing to all humanity, while respecting the distinct national identities within it, and not by the creation of a cosmopolitan "world religion" that seeks to blur distinct national identities.

Therefore, he champions the viewpoint that with the establishment of the state of Israel, the time has come for the practical realization of this purpose, and calls for the Jewish people to actively pursue it. Part of this program is the publicizing and formalization of the Noahide movement through the organization Brit Olam, which Cherki heads.

Published works
Consistent with his method of teaching that emphasizes face-to-face instruction, Rav Cherki spends much time giving classes in various frameworks around Israel, averaging 20 classes a week. These classes can be accessed in the archives of Machon Meir and on his personal website. His students have transcribed and edited many classes into book and booklet form, published mostly in Hebrew and French. The following is a selected list of his major publications:

 Bayt Melukha - a prayer book for Israel Independence Day and Jerusalem Day (Hebrew)
 Zayt Ra'anan – a collection of articles on the Jewish holidays (Hebrew)
 "On the Eight Chapters of the Rambam" – a commentary on the Rambam's introduction to the Ethics of the Fathers. (Hebrew)
 "Lessons in Kuzari" (Two Volumes) – a commentary on Rabbi Judah Halevi's work on Jewish thought (Hebrew)
 "Sanctity and Nature" – a collection of articles on various topics on personal belief, the nature of Torah, culture and lifestyle, and Zionism (Hebrew)
 "Clear Thought: World and Man in Rav Kook's Teachings" (Hebrew)
 "Lessons on Mesilat Yesharim" - a commentary on the Ramchal's work Mesilat Yesharim (Hebrew)
 "Ahead of Time – Exposing the Roots of the Holidays" (Hebrew)
 Translation of Abraham Livni's book "The Return of Israel and the Hope of the World" from its original French into Hebrew. An English translation of the book  was published in 2013.

References

External links
 Official website, Articles in English <http://ravsherki.org/index.php?option=com_content&view=categories&id=310&Itemid=101680>
 Profile and lesson archive at Machon Meir <http://www.meirtv.co.il/site/rabbis.asp?rabbi=3774>
 Brit Olam: Noahide World Center headed by Rav Cherki <http://en.noahideworldcenter.org/>
 Archive of radio interviews on current events at SoundCloud (https://soundcloud.com/ourim)
 "The Rabbi and the Professor" TV series of short debates on a range of issues between Rav Cherki and Prof. Carlo Strenger (in Hebrew) <http://www.orot.tv/category_main.aspx?id=50>
 Non-profit organization Ourim dedicated to publishing and promoting Rav Cherki's works <http://ourim.org/>
 Unofficial archive of downloadable lessons <http://ravsherki.com/>
 YouTube Channel of R. Cherki (https://www.youtube.com/user/umotatourim?spfreload=10)
 Facebook profile of R. Cherki (https://www.facebook.com/ravsherki/)

Living people
Israeli philosophers
1959 births
Israeli Orthodox Jews
Israeli people of Algerian-Jewish descent
Jewish philosophers
French emigrants to Israel
Mercaz HaRav alumni